Zosia is a given name or popular diminutive of name Zofia. Notable people with the name include:

 Zosia Karbowiak (born 1980), Polish singer-songwriter
 Zosia Mamet (born 1988), American actress and musician
 Gila Golan (born 1940, originally Zosia Zawadzka), Israeli former model and actress
 Zosia March, a fictional character from the BBC medical drama Holby City
 Zosia, a character from the Polish epic poem Pan Tadeusz
 Zosia Boski, a character from the Polish historical novel Fire in the Steppe

See also
 Zosia, crater on Venus

Polish feminine given names